The election for Resident Commissioner to the United States House of Representatives took place on November 6, 1984, the same day as the larger Puerto Rican general election and the United States elections, 1984.

Candidates for Resident Commissioner
 Nelson Femadas for the New Progressive Party
 Jaime Fuster for the Popular Democratic Party
 Angel Viera Martínez for the Puerto Rican Renewal Party
 Francisco Catalá Oliveras for the Puerto Rican Independence Party

Election results

See also 
Puerto Rican general election, 1984

References 

http://electionspuertorico.org/mapas/legislativos/1984.html

1984 Puerto Rico elections
Puerto Rico
1984